Yanar Mohammed (born 1960) is a prominent Iraqi feminist who was born in Baghdad. She is a co-founder and the director of the Organization of Women's Freedom in Iraq, and serves as the editor of the newspaper Al-Mousawat (Equality). She started the first shelters for women in Iraq since 2003, protecting them from "honor killing" and sex-trafficking, a network that expanded to 11 houses in 5 cities in 2018. Her shelters saved hundreds of vulnerable women in 16 years.

Biography 

Mohammed was born in Baghdad, Iraq. She was raised and lived in the city within a liberal family where her mother was a school teacher and her father was an engineer. Her grandfather on her mother's side was religious, and a prominent man in his community who "definitely deserved the honorary title of Mullah", except that he married his ex-wife's fourteen-year-old younger sister, which first spurred Yanar Mohammed to take up the cause of women's rights.

Mohammed graduated from the Baghdad University in Architecture with a bachelor's degree 1984, and a Masters in 1993. After postgraduate studies and travel to Canada, she was active in the Worker Communist Party in Iraq which she left later in 2018.

In 1995, her family moved from Iraq to Canada. In 1998, Mohammed founded the Defense of Iraqi Women’s Rights organization, which later in 2003 became the Organization for Women's Freedom in Iraq.

After the 2003 US-led invasion of Iraq, Mohammed returned to Baghdad, a return which she funded by a lifetime of savings and work in Architecture . Upon her return to Iraq, Mohammed founded a group to promote the rights of women in post-Saddam Iraq, the Organization of Women’s Freedom in Iraq after she had founded a women's group previously in Canada under the name the Defence of Iraqi Women’s Rights. She also edited the feminist newsletter Al-Mousawat.

In 2003, Mohammed established the Organization of Women's Freedom in Iraq, a group active in supporting women's rights in the post US-led invasion since 2003. The organization set up women's shelters and safe houses to protect women threatened by domestic abuse and what are referred to as honor killings, led ongoing activities against trafficking of young women, ran classes to teach women activists how to confront intolerance, advocated equality for women on Iraqi radio and television. Mohammed also interviewed and assisted about 30 women held in prison. Following those interviews, one person was saved from a death sentence while many a few were saved from re-entering sex-trafficking circles. Mohammed's work in the Organization for Women's Freedom in Iraq established a network of women's shelter in 4 cities around Iraq, where more than 870 women regained their well-being and dignity throughout 16 years (2003-2019). During her work on this group, Mohammed was awarded the Gruber Foundation Women's Rights Prize in 2008 and Norway's Rafto Prize in 2016. In 2018, she was listed as one of BBC's 100 Women. Mohammed meanwhile studied in the University of Toronto within the Ontario Institute for Studies in Education and wrote a Masters thesis under the title "Theorizing Feminist Struggle in Post-War Iraq 2003-2018". Although Mohammed's shelters were not approved by the Iraqi government, she continues to shelter women from all kinds of violence until this current day.

Political views 

Mohammed campaigns for women's rights. She favors secularism and democracy, but she does not support the USA's involvement in Iraq as a democratizing force.

She has been strongly critical of the US invasion of Iraq, stating the «US occupation turned the streets of Iraq into a no-women zone», and «the American occupation that is willing to do genocide, or... political Islam, that will make us live in a completely inhuman and unliberated way of life», thus preferring a third way to build freedom in Iraq. Speaking in an interview in 2007, she stated «The US troops need to leave immediately, with no conditions.» Mohammed then believes that the US occupation of Iraq is fuelling the insurgency and violence prevalent in post-2003 Iraq, which is having a detrimental effect on women's rights.

Yanar Mohammed, whilst not being anti-religion, is a strong believer in secular government, arguing that women's equality can only be achieved through secular government because an Islamic government would hurt women’s rights and freedom. Yanar highlights the contrast between the treatment of her grandmothers half a century ago and the regressing daily experience of women in Iraq nowadays.

As a result of her work on women's rights that questions the extreme interpretations of Islam, Yanar Mohammed has been subjected to death threats and was forced  to restrict her movement. Jaish al Sahaba, part of the Iraqi Islamist group the Supreme Command for Jihad and Liberation, sent two death threats to Yanar Mohammed in 2004. These were quoted as being directly related to her efforts to achieve gender equality within the Iraqi society. After many years of being vocal about protection and rights of women, the threats subsided, and her organization and shelters are considered the sole safe place for jeopardized women in Iraq. Her organization, the Organization for Women's Freedom in Iraq, started classes on feminist theory and are gradually expanding into a Feminist School .

Awards and recognition 

 2008 Gruber Prize for Women's Rights
 2016 Rafto Prize

She is also portrayed in the documentary I am the Revolution by Benedetta Argentieri.

References

External links
Interview with Yanar Mohammed in Guernica Magazine
Interview with Yanar Mohammed
Organization for Women's Freedom in Iraq website
Organization for Women's Freedom in Iraq recent website

1960 births
Living people
Iraqi feminists
Iraqi women's rights activists
Asian newspaper editors
People from Baghdad
Iraqi expatriates in Canada
University of Baghdad alumni
Women newspaper editors
BBC 100 Women